Jacksonville is the largest city in the U.S. state of Florida.

Jacksonville may also refer to:

Places

United States
Jacksonville, Alabama
Jacksonville, Arkansas
Jacksonville, Georgia
Jacksonville, Towns County, Georgia
Jacksonville, Illinois
Jacksonville, Indiana
Jacksonville, Iowa
Jamestown, Kentucky, formerly known as Jacksonville
Phoenix, Maryland, also known as Jacksonville
Jacksonville, Missouri
Jacksonville, Sullivan County, Missouri
Jacksonville, New Jersey
Jacksonville, New York
Jacksonville, North Carolina
Jacksonville, Ohio 
Jacksonville, Adams County, Ohio
Jacksonville, Oregon
Jacksonville, Pennsylvania
Jacksonville, Centre County, Pennsylvania
Jacksonville, Lehigh County, Pennsylvania
Jacksonville, Texas
Jacksonville, Vermont
Floyd, Virginia, originally named Jacksonville

Jacksonville, West Virginia
Jacksonville, Wisconsin

Other
Jacksonville, New Brunswick, Canada see List of New Brunswick provincial highways

  Jacksonville, a former settlement on East Caicos in the Turks and Caicos Islands

Education
Jacksonville College, a private junior college in Jacksonville, Texas
Jacksonville State University, a public collegiate level institution in Jacksonville, Alabama
Jacksonville University, a private collegiate level institution in Jacksonville, Florida
Jacksonville Theological Seminary, a theological seminary in Jacksonville, Florida

Music and television
 Jacksonville, the working title of the Ryan Adams album released as Jacksonville City Nights
 "Jacksonville", a song by Sufjan Stevens from his album Illinois
 "Jacksonville" (Fringe), an episode of the television series Fringe
 "Jacksonville" (Space Ghost Coast to Coast), an episode of Space Ghost Coast to Coast

See also
Jacksonville Jaguars, an American football team based in Jacksonville, Florida
Jacksonville Jumbo Shrimp, a baseball team based in Jacksonville, Florida